"The Wonder of You" is a song written by Baker Knight. It was originally recorded by Vince Edwards in 1958, but this recording has never been released.
In an interview with a DJ from Chattanooga, Tennessee, Ray Peterson told the story of how Baker Knight confided that "The Wonder of You" was originally written as a gospel song.

Ray Peterson recording
In 1959, "The Wonder of You" was first released by Ray Peterson as a single. The song became a Top 40 hit for him on the Billboard Hot 100, peaking at #25, and it briefly re-entered the Hot 100 peaking at #70, in 1964.  The 1959 Ray Peterson recording also reached #23 in the UK.

Elvis Presley version

Elvis Presley had a no. 1 hit in the UK and a Top 10 hit in the U.S. with his 1970 live version of "The Wonder of You" recorded in Las Vegas, Nevada in February 1970. The song was released as a single on April 20, 1970, backed by the song "Mama Liked the Roses". In the United States, both songs charted at #9 together during 27 June - 11 July 1970. "The Wonder of You" was one of his most successful records in the UK ever, topping the UK Singles Chart for six weeks in the summer of that year. It has sold over 400,000 equivalent units in the UK, qualifying the single for a gold sales certification in 2022. It also stayed at number one in the Irish Charts for three weeks that same year. This was the 59th Top 40 hit of his career. Presley's version also reached number 37 on the US Country Singles chart, and number one on the easy listening chart.

"The Wonder of You" was one of about thirty-five songs Presley would regularly perform at concerts.

According to Peterson, "He [Elvis] asked me if I would mind if he recorded 'The Wonder of You.' I said, 'You don't have to ask permission; you're Elvis Presley.' He said, 'Yes, I do. You're Ray Peterson.'"

In 2016, a version of the song featuring the Royal Philharmonic Orchestra was released together with other orchestral versions of Elvis songs in the album The Wonder of You.

Other recordings
Also 1959, it was recorded by Ronnie Hilton. His version was also a hit reaching #22 on the UK Singles Chart. The song later appeared on the second season of the TV series The Crown. 
In the early 1960s, the Platters also recorded this song, which appeared on a 1970s compilation The Platters – 30 Golden Hits.
In 1969, The Sandpipers recorded an album of the same name including the song.
An album of instrumentals of the same name by Nelson Riddle was also released in 2000.
In 2017, Conor O'Brien recorded the song for Big Little Lies that was sung by Ed (played by Adam Scott) in the first-season finale.
Uruguayan punk/rockabilly band Rudos Wild recorded the song for their debut album Psychos With Wax

Popularity in association football
The song has been adopted by English Association football club Port Vale, which runs out to the song at the start of its home matches, while the club's fans sing the song throughout their matches, periodically with altered lyrics.  Arsenal Football Club also adopted the song as their opening anthem upon their move to the Emirates Stadium.

Scottish club Ross County have also adopted the song as an anthem at the end of home matches.

See also
List of number-one singles of 1970 (Ireland)
List of UK Singles Chart number ones of the 1970s
List of number-one adult contemporary singles of 1970 (U.S.)

References

1959 singles
1970 singles
Elvis Presley songs
UK Singles Chart number-one singles
Irish Singles Chart number-one singles
Port Vale F.C.
Football songs and chants
Songs written by Baker Knight
1959 songs
Rock ballads
RCA Records singles